Greg Melville (born 1970) is a journalist and author. He graduated from Kenyon College in 1992 and Pennsylvania State University Graduate School of Communication in 1994.

Writing career
A former newspaper reporter, and editor at Sports Afield and Men’s Journal, he has written for such publications as Men’s Journal, National Geographic Adventure, The New York Times, Outside, Best Life, Parents, and Popular Science. He is author of the book on sustainability, Greasy Rider: Two dudes, one fry-oil-powered car, and a cross-country search for a greener future. The book recounts his cross-country trip in a diesel Mercedes station wagon powered by waste vegetable oil, and investigates the keys to a greener future that are already at-hand. The book inspired filmmakers J. J. Beck and Joey Carey to create a documentary of the same title. It was released in 2009 and featured Yoko Ono, Morgan Freeman, Rae Dawn Chong, and Noam Chomsky.

His latest project is the book Over My Dead Body: Unearthing the Hidden History of America's Cemeteries.

Personal life
Melville lives with his family in Annapolis, Maryland. He teaches English as a professor at the United States Naval Academy.

Bibliography
101 Best Outdoor Towns, Sarah Tuff, Greg Melville, Countryman Press, Woodstock, VT, 2007 
Greasy Rider: Two dudes, one fry-oil-powered car and a cross-country search for a greener future. Greg Melville, Algonquin Books of Chapel Hill, Chapel Hill, NC, 2008 
Over My Dead Body: Unearthing the Hidden History of America's Cemeteries. Greg Melville, Abrams Press, New York, NY, 2022 ISBN 978-1419754852

References

External links
CNN interview with Greg Melville - Transcript
Melville's Greasy Rider blog

21st-century American non-fiction writers
American male journalists
1970 births
Living people
21st-century American male writers